SFCA may refer to:

San Francisco
Southeastern Film Critics Association
 Science Fiction Comics Association
Société Française de Construction Aéronautique
Surfactant-Free Cellulose Acetate